Hal M. Lattimore (October 13, 1920 – March 27, 2014) was an American jurist.

Born in Fort Worth, Texas, Lattimore flew transport planes during World War II, He then received his bachelor's degree from Baylor University and his law degree from University of Texas School of Law. He then practiced law. In 1973, Lattimore was appointed Texas District Court judge and then Texas Court of Appeals judge. He died in Fort Worth, Texas.

Notes

1920 births
2014 deaths
People from Fort Worth, Texas
Baylor University alumni
University of Texas School of Law alumni
Texas state court judges
20th-century American judges
American military personnel of World War II